Aedophron is a genus of moths of the family Erebidae.

Species
 Aedophron phlebophora Lederer, 1858
 Aedophron rhodites (Eversmann, 1851)
 Aedophron sumorita Ronkay, 2002
 Aedophron venosa Christoph, 1887

References
 Aedophron at Markku Savela's Lepidoptera and some other life forms
 Natural History Museum Lepidoptera genus database

Heliothinae
Noctuoidea genera